Crabbs Peninsula is a long narrow finger of land which extends from the northeast coast of Antigua. It lies between Long Island and Guana Island, the fourth and fifth largest islands of Antigua and Barbuda. The small settlement of Parham lies close to the base of the peninsula.

Naval Base Crabbs  
In 1941, Crabbs Peninsula was leased for 99 years to the US Military, due to World War II in the Destroyers-for-bases deal. A United States Navy Station was built with a camp for  United States Marine Corps and United States Coast Guard. The Naval Air Station construction started on 17 March 1941 and improvement ended in 1943. After the war in 1945, the base was closed. The Navy dredged a channel near Maiden Island on the south side of the base for shipping. The dredge made two small islands.  During the war the station had one patrol squadron of seaplanes with a seaplane tender. The station was built by civilian workers.

Demographics 
Crabbs Peninsula has one enumeration district, ED 51304.

Crabbs is considered to be part of Vernons for census purposes.

The enumeration district has an area of 2.36 square kilometers.

See also
Waller Air Force Base in center of Trinidad 
Bombardment of Curaçao
US Naval Advance Bases
United States Naval Forces Southern Command

References

Landforms of Antigua and Barbuda